St Michael and All Angels' Church, Cofton Hackett is a Grade II* listed parish church in the Church of England in Worcestershire.

History

St Michael and All Angels Anglican Church is located on Cofton Church Lane. A church may have existed on the site in the 12th century, as a "chapel" at Cofton is mentioned in a Papal Bull of 1182.

The present building certainly dates back to the 14th century and was probably built in 1330 by Robert de Leycester as a chapel for the Manor House.  It was a chapel annexed to St Laurence's Church, Northfield until 1866.

The church was renovated in 1861 by the architect Henry Day.

The church is in a joint parish with St. Andrew's Church, Barnt Green.

References

Church of England church buildings in Worcestershire
Cofton Hackett